CER ( – Digital Electronic Computer) model 22 is a transistor based computer developed by Mihajlo Pupin Institute (Serbia) in 1967-1968. It was originally intended for banking applications and was used for data processing and management planning in banks, trade and utility companies in Belgrade. Three CER-22 computers were purchased by Beobanka, Jugopetrol and BVK–Belgrade companies. (For more details see: Ref.# 1, #2, #3, and #4).

The principal designers and chiefs of the project teams were:
 
Dušan Hristović, Svetomir Ojdanić, Veselin Potić, Radivoje Ilić et al. for Beobanka;
Dr Sc. Miroslav Jocković, Branimir Leposavic, Michael Savikin, Ljubivoje Marković et al., for Jugopetrol co.;
Vladislav Paunović, Miloš Marjanović, Petar Vrbavac, Dragiša Tinković et al. for BVK-Belgrade.

Technical characteristics of the CER-22
 Technology: IC (MSI), transistor and diode logic circuits (See also: Ref. #2, #5, #6).
 Printed circuits boards with the ribbon connectors;
 CPU performance: the 16-cycle instructions (10 microseconds);
 Magnetic core memory: 32 KB capacity (memory cycle time of 2 microseconds);
 Disk storage CDC-854 (max 8 disk units);
 Card reader and puncher:  300 cards/min and 150 cards/min;
 Paper tape reader and puncher, type "Facit": 1000 characters/s and 150 characters/s;
 Parallel Line Printer, type DP MZ-4: 128 characters/line, 600 lines/min.

See also
 CER Computers
 CER-10
 Mihajlo Pupin Institute, 
 History of computer hardware in the SFRY

References
 Electronic Computer System CER-22 (Dušan Hristović, Ljubivoje Marković, Slavoljub Rajić), Proc. of IV Symp. Informatika-68, pp. 271–278, Ljubljana-Bled, October 1968; In Serbian.
 Computer CER-22 (Dušan Hristović), HPEEA journal, No 10, pp. 5–12, Belgrade October 1969; In Serbian.
 Digital electronic computers CER (M. Momčilović, D. Hristović, et al.), Proc. of the seminar Mehanizacija i AOP u preduzećima, pp. 38–58, Nova Varoš,  May 22, 1969; In Serbian.
 “TIM Computers” (D. Milićević, D. Hristović Ed.), pp. 165–166,  Naucna knjiga, Belgrade 1990;
 Review and Analysis of the computers CER (Vladislav Paunović, Dušan Hristović), Proc. of the 44. Conf. ETRAN-2000, vol.3, pp. 79–82, Soko Banja,  June 26, 2000. In Serbian.
 Computing technology in Serbia, by Dusan Hristovic, PHLOGISTON journal, No 18/19, pp. 89–105, Museum MNT-SANU, Belgrade 2010/2011. In Serbian.

External links
 CER-22 - manufacturer's web-site.

CER computers
Transistorized computers
Mihajlo Pupin Institute